Extent may refer to:

Computing 
 Extent (file systems), a contiguous region of computer storage medium reserved for a file
 Extent File System, a discontinued file system implementation named after the contiguous region
 Extent, a chunk of storage space logical volume management uses internally to provide various device mappings
 Extent, in computer programming, is the period during which a variable has a particular value

Other 
 Extent, a technical description of the wingspan of a bird, bat, or other flying animal
 Extent, a writ allowing a creditor to seize or assume temporary ownership of a debtor's property; also, the actual seizure in its execution
 Map extent, the portion of a region shown in a map

See also 
 Extant (disambiguation)